Calliostoma iwaotakii is a species of sea snail, a marine gastropod mollusk in the family Calliostomatidae.

Some authors place this taxon in the subgenus Calliostoma (Tristichotrochus)

Description

Distribution

References

External links

iwaotakii
Gastropods described in 1961